Edgerley may refer to:


Places

Australia
Edgerley, Elizabeth Bay, a heritage-listed house in Sydney, New South Wales

United Kingdom
Edgerley, Cheshire, a civil parish in Cheshire, England
Edgerley, Shropshire, a location in England

United States
Edgerley (Oakland, New York), a historic house in Livingston County, New York, United States

People
John Edgerley, New Zealand botanist
Kate Edgerley, New Zealand botanist

See also 
 Edgerly, a similar name